The inferior labial vein is the vein receiving blood from the lower lip.

Additional images

External links

Veins of the head and neck